Male, in biology, is the half of a sex system that produces sperm cells.
 Male plant, a plant that gives rise to male gametophytes

Male may also refer to:

Gender
 Male, the gender of men and boys
 Man, a male adult
 Boy, a young male person, usually a child or adolescent
 Masculinity, attributes associated with men and boys

Art and entertainment 
 Male (film), a 2015 Indian film
 Male (Foetus album), a 1992 live album by Foetus
 Male (Natalie Imbruglia album), a 2015 studio album by Natalie Imbruglia
 , a German band
 Il Male, an Italian satirical magazine published in Italy between 1978 and 1982

Places 
 Malé, the capital of the Maldives
 Malé Island, the island the city is on
 Malé Atoll, the atoll the island is in
 Malé, Italy, a municipality in the province of Trento, Italy
 Małe, Łódź Voivodeship, a village in central Poland
 Małe, Pomeranian Voivodeship, a village in northern Poland
 Mâle, Orne, a village in France
 Male, Belgium, a quarter in Bruges
 Male, Vikramgad, a village in Maharashtra, India
 Male (woreda), a woreda in Ethiopia
 Males, Crete, a village in Greece
 Maleš (mountain), a mountain in Bulgaria and North Macedonia
 Male, Mauritania, a town in Mauritania

People named Male
 Male (surname) (including a list of people with the name)
 Male Rao Holkar (1745–1767), Maharaja of Indore
 The Malês, as in the Malê revolt
 Male Sa'u (born 1987), Japanese professional rugby union footballer

Other uses 
 Masculine gender, in languages with grammatical gender
 Male connector, in hardware and electronics
 Male language, several languages
 Maale people, an ethnic group of Ethiopia
 Medium-altitude long-endurance unmanned aerial vehicle, an unmanned aerial vehicle
 malE, a bacterial gene encoding maltose-binding protein

See also 
 Female (disambiguation)
 Male and Female (disambiguation)
 Masculine (disambiguation)
 Feminine (disambiguation)
 Mail (disambiguation)
 Mele (disambiguation)